Fresh To Order  (f2o) is a "Fine Fast," casual dining franchise restaurant.

Background
Founded by restaurateur Pierre Panos in 2005, Fresh To Order opened its first location in 2006 and currently has fifteen locations open in Indiana, Georgia, Tennessee, and South Carolina.

References

External links
Fresh To Order website

Restaurants in Georgia (U.S. state)
Companies based in Fulton County, Georgia
Restaurants established in 2005
2005 establishments in Georgia (U.S. state)